Croton-Harmon High School is a secondary school located in Croton-on-Hudson, New York. It is administered by the Croton-Harmon Union Free School District, and serves 9th-12th grade students. There were 542 students enrolled in the 2006–2007 school year. In the 2018–2019 school year, there were 506 students enrolled. Due to an increase in students since its original construction, it was expanded in the 1950s with a gym, and again in 2005–2006 with eight new classrooms, an auxiliary gym, and a new library. Between 2006 and 2017, the library also included a space for students to use desktop computers. In 2017, the school received a grant for a Nureva Span system, which replaced the desktop computers in favor of a more collaborative learning support system.

The school is ranked #433 in US News National Rankings.

History
 The school was built in 1923.
 During the second World War, a small radar post was placed on the roof; it has long since been dismantled.
 In the 1950s, the first expansion was made onto the school.
 The school has a time capsule donated by the Class of 2006 to be opened by the Class of 2056.
 In 2005 and 2006, the school underwent an expansion of several classrooms.
 The school has a plaque donated to the first World War I soldier from Croton-on-Hudson who died.

Classes
The school offers the usual range of high school classes, as well as the following AP classes: Biology, Macroeconomics, Calculus AB and BC, Physics, Chemistry, Spanish Language, French Language, English Language, English Literature, Statistics, Studio Art, Environmental Science, World History, US History, and Advanced Placement Comparative Government and Politics.

Language classes include Spanish, French, Mandarin Chinese, and English as a Second Language (ESL).  The school also offers a number of electives including music and art classes.

Honors courses are not offered.  All ninth grade and tenth grade students are enrolled in Regents level English courses.  Exceptional performance in these classes will place an honors ("H") merit on the student's transcript. Juniors and seniors have the option of enrolling in AP level English courses instead of taking further Regents level courses.

Lawsuits

2019 Title IX Lawsuit 
As of 2019, Croton-Harmon High School has been the subject of an ongoing Title IX lawsuit. The suit stems from the 2016 sexual assault of a freshman at a house party by multiple Croton-Harmon High School students. The suit claims that the victim was extensively bullied for coming forward, that the student faced retaliatory grading by Croton-Harmon High School teachers, and the school did not comply with Title IX because it did not separate the victim from her attackers. The suit also claims that the school denied the victim's repeated requests to change school.

References

External links 
 CHHS website

Public high schools in Westchester County, New York
Educational institutions established in 1923
1923 establishments in New York (state)